Quattro is Italian for the number four.

Quattro may also refer to:

People
 "Quattro", a nickname of A. J. Foyt IV

Fictional characters
 Quattro Vageena or Quattro Bageena, an alias of Char Aznable in the Mobile Suit Gundam anime series
 Quattro, a character in Magical Girl Lyrical Nanoha Strikers

Transportation
 Southern Skies Quattro, an American  paramotor

Audi-related
 Audi Quattro, a model of car
 Quattro (four-wheel-drive system), an Audi trademark
 Audi e-tron Quattro (disambiguation)
 Audi Sport GmbH, an Audi private subsidiary company formerly known as "Quattro Gmbh".

Computing and computer games
 Quattro compilations, a series of video game compilations (each with four games) released for the NES in the 1990s
 Borland Quattro and Quattro Pro, spreadsheet applications by Borland
 The Microsoft codename for the Windows Home Server

Other 
 Quattro, a range of four-bladed razors from Wilkinson Sword (sold in the U.S. under the Schick brand)
 Quattrocento, the cultural and artistic events of 15th century Italy
 Adept Quattro, a pick-and-place robot made by Adept Technology

See also

 
 
Quatro (disambiguation)
Cuatro (disambiguation)
Quarto (disambiguation)
Cuarto (disambiguation)